Cistanche is a worldwide genus of holoparasitic desert plants in the family Orobanchaceae. They lack chlorophyll and obtain nutrients and water from the host plants whose roots they parasitize. They are often known as desert hyacinths.

Taxonomy
There are between 20 and 30 species of Cistanche. The most comprehensive description of the genus was published in 1930. The taxonomy is difficult because important features of the flowers are often poorly preserved after drying. The plants are found from the Mediterranean region, North Africa, Middle East through to China. The species of Cistanche are parasitic plants that connect to the conductive system of a host, extracting water and nutrients from the roots of the host plant.

Growth
They typically grow in desert or sand dune areas Growing in arid regions, where their flower spikes that emerge from bare ground are the only evidence of the presence of the plants. They do not have leaves and do not perform photosynthesis.

Some species of Cistanche are native to the Taklimakan desert region of Xinjiang Uyghur Autonomous Region northwest China where they grow on desert host plants tamarix and Haloxylon ammodendron.

Uses
Along with other members of the genus, Cistanche deserticola is the primary source of the Chinese herbal medicine cistanche (Chinese: 肉苁蓉, pinyin ròucōngróng). The main sources of cistanche are Cistanche salsa and Cistanche deserticola, although it may also be obtained from Cistanche tubulosa, Cistanche sinensis, and Cistanche ambigua. The drug, known in Chinese as suosuo dayun, is collected in spring before sprouting, by slicing the stems of the plant. Cistanche deserticola has been placed on CITES Appendix 2, a list of endangered species not banned from trade but requiring monitoring. With increased consumption of cistanche, the population of the species has decreased and its area of distribution has shrunk. Aside from over-collection or indiscriminate collection, an important factor in the diminished supply of cistanche is a loss of the host, Haloxylon ammodendron, which is widely used for firewood.

References

Orobanchaceae
Orobanchaceae genera
Plants used in traditional Chinese medicine